Fumnaya Israel Abidemi Taoreed Shomotun (born 29 May 1997) is a Nigeria-born footballer who plays as an attacking midfielder for Sevenoaks Town.

Career
Shomotun played youth football for Brentford before joining Barnet in early 2014. He made his first-team debut on 16 December 2014, as a substitute in an FA Trophy replay against Concord Rangers. Shomotun signed a one-year professional contract at the start of the 2015-16 season. He joined Staines Town on loan in November 2015, for whom he made eight appearances. Shomotun made his Football League debut on 13 February 2016, coming on as an 84th-minute substitute for Chris Hackett in a 2-0 away win at Dagenham & Redbridge. Shomotun joined Margate on loan on 13 January 2017.

His contract was extended by Barnet at the end of the 2017–18 season after the club exercised an option. Shomotun joined Wealdstone on loan on 7 September 2018. He scored on his debut in the FA Cup against Great Wakering Rovers on 22 September. He was released by the Bees at the end of the 2018-19 season.

Shomotun joined Wealdstone on 15 November 2019. He signed for Hayes & Yeading United on 1 January 2020. Later that month he joined Wingate & Finchley.

In July 2022, Shomotun joined Kingstonian.

Career statistics

References

External links

1997 births
Living people
Nigerian footballers
Association football midfielders
Brentford F.C. players
Barnet F.C. players
Staines Town F.C. players
Margate F.C. players
Wealdstone F.C. players
Hayes & Yeading United F.C. players
Wingate & Finchley F.C. players
Kingstonian F.C. players
Sevenoaks Town F.C. players
English Football League players
National League (English football) players
Isthmian League players
Southern Football League players